Forever Is the World is the seventh and final studio album by the Norwegian gothic metal band Theatre of Tragedy. It was released on 18 September 2009, on AFM Records. The album was produced by the Zeromancer singer Alexander Møklebust and mastered by Bjørn Engelmann.

The cover art was designed by Thomas Ewerhard, who made the covers for the previous two albums by the band, Storm and Assembly. When the cover art was revealed on the band's website, they said that it had been designed to incorporate elements from the covers of all of their previous studio albums as a challenge to their most diehard fans.

Since the release of the record there have been complaints about the mixing and mastering of the album with claims of fuzzing and clipping. The album has been linked by fans to the loudness war.

Track listing

Personnel

Theatre of Tragedy
Nell Sigland – vocals
Raymond István Rohonyi – programming, vocals
Frank Claussen – guitar
Vegard K. Thorsen – guitar
Lorentz Aspen – keyboards
Hein Frode Hansen – drums

Additional musicians
Magnus Westgaard – bass guitar

Production
Alexander Møklebust – producer, engineer, mixing
Mads Storkersen, Aleksander Nyhus - engineers
Pzy-clone - drum editing & additional string arrangements
Kristian Sigland - additional writing and arrangements on tracks 1, 3 and 7
Björn Engelmann – mastering at Cutting Room, Sweden
Thomas Ewerhard – cover art

References

2009 albums
Theatre of Tragedy albums
AFM Records albums